Clinton Walker is an Australian writer, best known for his works on popular music. He is known for his books Highway to Hell (1994; a biography of Bon Scott),  Buried Country (2000; also a film and soundtrack album), History is Made at Night (2012), and others. He has also written on other subjects, in books such as Football Life (1998) and Golden Miles (2005), and has worked extensively as a journalist and in television.

Early life
Born in Bendigo, Victoria, in 1957, Walker dropped out of art school in Brisbane in the late 70s to start a punk fanzine with Andrew McMillan and to write for student newspapers.

Career
In 1978 he moved to Melbourne, where he worked on-air for 3RRR, and with Bruce Milne on the fanzine Pulp, and wrote for the fledgling Roadrunner magazine.

Moving on to Sydney in 1980, he commenced a career as a freelance journalist. Over the next 15 years he wrote for a wide variety of magazines and newspapers, including longstanding associations with both RAM and Australian Rolling Stone; he also wrote extensively for Stiletto, The Bulletin, The Age, New Woman, Playboy, Inside Sport, the Edge and Juice.

Books
He published his first book, Inner City Sound, in 1981. It documented the emergence of independent Australian punk/post-punk music, and itself became an icon of the movement. After the book fell out of print in the mid-80s, bootleg photocopies of it began to crop up for sale in Melbourne record stores. Eventually, in 2005, Verse Chorus Press in the US re-released a revised and expanded edition, at the same time as a CD anthology with the same title.

In 1984, after a couple of years in London, England, Walker returned to Australia and published his second book (The Next Thing), and got a job cleaning toilets at Pancakes on the Rocks.

Walker's third book, Highway to Hell, a biography of Bon Scott (1994), was widely acclaimed and a best seller in Australia; it has continuously remained in print ever since, making it probably the most enduring Australian music book ever, ahead of even Billy Thorpe’s Sex & Thugs & Rock’n’Roll. Subsequently, it was published in the US, and translated into French, Spanish, Italian, Bulgarian, and Finnish. 

Walker then published Stranded: The Secret History of Australian Independent Music 1977-1991 (1996) and Football Life (1998). Stranded was initially somewhat contentious for its non-mainstream view, but it was better understood when the Invisible Spectrum published a new updated edition in 2021. As reviewer Des Cowley said: “Reading Stranded today with a quarter-century’s hindsight, it’s easy to see that Walker mostly got things right. And if he stumbled now and again, it’s still the case he was streaks ahead of the pack.” Football Life was a sort of companion piece to Stranded, another personal history but this time of minor-league Australian Rules culture.

His sixth book, Buried Country, a history of Aboriginal country music, was published in 2000 and spawned a documentary film and soundtrack CD with the same title. "Like many of Walker’s projects", Martin Jones wrote in Rhythms, "Buried Country was at least a decade ahead of its time". At a time when Aboriginal music still wasn’t established or accepted as a fixture on the broader Australian music scene, Walker had long been one of its few media champions, and Buried Country was hailed as a pioneering and monumental work of music historiography, and still stands as the closest thing Australia's ever produced to the efforts of a Harry Smith or Peter Guralnick. A new updated edition of the book was released in 2015 along with a rebooted version of the CD called Buried Country 1.5, and as a result of their even greater success than the first time around, a touring live stageshow adaptation premiered in 2016 and played the festival circuit for a few years. In 2018, Australian singer-songwriter Darren Hanlon, in conjunction with Mississippi Records in the US, produced a vinyl iteration of the Buried Country compilation that included even more new rare tracks. 

In 2005, his seventh book, Golden Miles: Sex, Speed and the Australian Muscle Car, was published. Three years before that in 2002, Walker had written a piece for the Sydney Morning Herald ‘Spectrum’ section celebrating the enduring cult appeal of unique Australian cars like the Holden Monaro and Valiant Charger, and it was encouragement enough for fledgling publisher Coloumb Communications to sign him up for the book on whose research the article was based. When Coloumb went bust before the artwork was completed, Walker’s contract was novated over to Lothian, and when Lothian released it, it was praised for its innovation, irreverent humour and beautiful design. When Lothian went bust, the book was picked up by yet another publisher, Wakefield Press, and re-released in 2009 in an expanded and updated edition.

In 2012, Walker published History is Made at Night, a polemic on the endangered Australian live music circuit. In 2013 he published his ninth book, The Wizard of Oz, about the ill-starred Australian speed ace from the 1920s, Norman 'Wizard' Smith, as well as co-producing the CD Silver Roads, an anthology of Australian country-rock from the 1970s.

After the debacle of Deadly Woman Blues in 2018, Walker returned to the publishing scene in 2021 with two books. Early in the year a new edition of his 1996 title Stranded was published, and then later in the year with the all-new Suburban Songbook. Suburban Songbook: Writing Hits in post-war/pre-Countdown Australia is a critical history of the early evolution of rock/pop songwriting in Australia, and was well-reviewed. As the i94Bar said: “If Walker had only ever written Inner City Sound or Highway to Hell, his reputation as the grand old historian of Australian music would have been assured. The Suburban Songbook bookends the lot and is at least as essential.”

Other work
In 1982 to 1983, he lived in London, England, where he worked at the Record & Tape Exchange and served as a stringer for Bruce Milne's pioneering cassette-zine Fast Forward.

Walker has also worked at ABC Television on the two documentary series, Long Way to the Top and Love is in the Air, as well as co-hosting, with Annette Shun Wah, the live music program Studio 22 and hosting the short-lived Fly-TV show for record collectors, Rare Grooves. He has contributed to many literary anthologies, from the 1995 best-seller Men-Love-Sex to the 2012 collection of journal Meanjin'''s 'greatest hits'; he has also produced and/or annotated a long list of CD anthologies, and appeared in many other rockumentaries.

Going into the 2000s, Walker started a decade-long stint in the academy, despite not having formal qualifications. He taught creative writing in the Media department at Macquarie University in Sydney, and served as an Honorary Research Fellow for the Thesis Eleven Centre for Cultural Sociology at LaTrobe University in Melbourne, in which capacity he wrote numerous papers published in journals and delivered at conferences in Australia and abroad. 

Walker has also worked as a cook, graphic artist, a DJ and a bookseller, has had his artwork exhibited in Sydney and Phnom Penh, and he was a member of the country-grunge band the Killer Sheep, who in 1987 released the single "Wild Down Home" on Au-Go-Go Records.

 Controversy Deadly Woman Blues, a history of black women in Australian music, was released in 2018 by a division of academic publisher UNSW Press, Each of 99 biographical entries was accompanied by a hand-drawn illustration by Walker. The book immediately garnered a few glowing reviews,

There was an angry backlash from four of the artists who expressed their displeasure at being included without being spoken to, and citing factual inaccuracies.  This led to social media outrage in which Walker was shamed as a racist, misogynist, colonialist privileged white male. The book was withdrawn from sale, with the publisher promising to pulp any unsold copies and never to reprint it.  

Walker admitted to mistakes and apologised for them, but he nevertheless suffered personal trauma and grave damage to his reputation. "I didn't try to obscure what I was doing, I didn't take all the appropriate steps. I've been involved in underclass music forever, and in some ways, this is no different, but in other ways, it is very different".  

Recognition
A reviewer of Golden Miles: Sex, Speed And The Australian Muscle Car in The Sydney Morning Herald has called him "our best chronicler of Australian grass-roots culture".

Bibliography
Inner City Sound (Wild & Woolley, 1981; revised and expanded edition, Verse Chorus Press, 2005)
The Next Thing (Kangaroo Press, 1984)
Highway to Hell: The Life and Times of AC/DC Legend Bon Scott (Pan Macmillan, 1994; revised edition, Verse Chorus Press, 2001)
Stranded: The Secret History of Australian Independent Music 1977-1991 (Pan Macmillan, 1996/Visible Spectrum, 2021)
 Football Life (PanMacmillan, 1998)
Buried Country (Pluto Press, 2000; revised and expanded edition Verse Chorus Press, 2015)
Golden Miles (Lothian, 2005; expanded edition, Wakefield Press, 2009)
 History is Made at Night (Currency House, 2012)
 Wizard of Oz (Wakefield Press, 2013)
 Deadly Woman Blues (New South, 2018/WITHDRAWN)
 Suburban Songbook (Goldentone, 2021)

Discography (as producer)
 Buried Country (Larrikin-Festival, 2000/Warner Music, 2015)
 Long Way to the Top (ABC, 2001)
 Studio 22 (ABC, 2002)
 Inner City Soundtrack (Laughing Outlaw, 2005)
 Silver Roads (Warner Music, 2013)

Videography (as writer)
 Notes from Home (ABC, 1987)
 Sing it in the Music (ABC, 1989)
 Studio 22 (ABC series, also as co-presenter, 1999-2003)
 Buried Country (Film Australia, 2000)
 Long Way to the Top (ABC, 2001)
 Love is in the Air (ABC, 2003)
 Rare Grooves (ABC series, also as presenter, 2003)

References

External links

 
 Clinton Walker on Rock's Back Pages

1957 births
Living people
Australian journalists
Australian music journalists